Crystal Wong Jia Ying (born 2 August 1999) is a Singaporean badminton player.

Career

2017–2021 
Wong won her first senior international title at the 2017 Iran Fajr International series in Iran, along with her then-partner Ong Ren-ne. At the 2019 Mongolia International, she won the women doubles event partnered with Shinta Mulia Sari, winning against the Korean pair of Jang Eun-seo and Jeong Na-eun, winning against them in 3 sets, 15–21, 21–19, 21–18.

2022 
At the 2022 Commonwealth Games, Wong won the bronze medal as part of the Singaporean team that finished as bronze medalists at the mixed team event. The Singaporean team defeated England 3–0 in the bronze medal playoff.

Achievements

BWF International Challenge/Series (4 titles, 4 runners-up) 
Women's doubles

Mixed doubles

  BWF International Challenge tournament
  BWF International Series tournament

References

External links 
 

1999 births
Living people
Sportspeople from Singapore
Singaporean female badminton players
Badminton players at the 2022 Commonwealth Games
Commonwealth Games bronze medallists for Singapore
Commonwealth Games medallists in badminton
Competitors at the 2019 Southeast Asian Games
Competitors at the 2021 Southeast Asian Games
Southeast Asian Games bronze medalists for Singapore
Southeast Asian Games medalists in badminton
21st-century Singaporean women
Medallists at the 2022 Commonwealth Games